Antonia López Arroyo, known as Adriana Vega (born 25 February 1960) is a former Spanish actress.

In 1978 she appeared in the TV program Destino Argentina as a flight-attendant, and in December she appeared in Sumarísimo as a police woman, along Manolo Codeso, Alfonso del Real, Nené Morales, Silvia Aguilar and Taida Urruzola. Her first three films includes  El violador y sus mujeres a la sombra de un recuerdo, Venus de fuego and Trampa sexual, directed by José Antonio Barrero, Germán Lorente and Manuel Esteba respectively. Then she appeared in Historia de S, Las siete magníficas y audaces mujeres (1979), El liguero mágico, Viciosas al desnudo (1980), El sexo sentido, La masajista vocacional and Los liantes (1981). Una gallina muy ponedora, El Cid cabreador, Juana la Loca... de vez en cuando (1983), Cuatro mujeres y un lío (1985), ¡¡Esto sí se hace!! (1987) and Jet Marbella Set (1991).

In May 1979, the magazine Interviú published naked photos.

She appeared on stage in the comedy  Revistas del corazón, by Juan José Alonso Millán and starring Analía Gadé and José Luis de Vilallonga, and Juegos de sociedad along Flavia Zarzo.

Filmography

References

External links
 

Living people
1960 births
20th-century Spanish actresses
21st-century Spanish actresses
Actresses from Madrid
Spanish film actresses
Spanish television actresses
Spanish stage actresses